"Summertime" is song by New Kids on the Block, and the first single from their album The Block. The single was released on May 13, 2008, and was the first new single released by the group since 1994.

On May 5, 2008, "Summertime" was posted on the group's MySpace page. The lead vocals were sung by Donnie Wahlberg, Jordan Knight, and Joey McIntyre.

The song's introduction has Joey McIntyre shouting out "Jones Beach! 1988!", referring to their rising popularity in that year.

Music video
The music video to the song premiered on VH1 on June 8, 2008. The video was directed by Thomas Kloss and Donnie Wahlberg. The video begins with Donnie exiting a hangar and texting the band members with the message, "It's on." He then boards a helicopter that is waiting for him. The other band members are each shown receiving the message while they are doing various activities like swimming or running and they head off to the beach. They are then shown singing on the beach and at a party.

Chart performance
The song peaked at number 36 on the Billboard Hot 100, becoming their first Top 40 hit since 1992's "If You Go Away". It has also peaked at number 24 on the Pop 100.

On the Canadian Hot 100 it made a "Hot Shot Debut" at number 17 rose to the top ten, peaking at number 9.

In Australia, the single peaked at number 90 on the ARIA Singles Chart, and number 23 on the ARIA physical sales chart.

Track listing
Promo CD
 "Summertime" (LP version)

Limited promo CD
 "Summertime" (album version)
 "Summertime" (RedOne remix)
 "Summertime" (instrumental)
 "Summertime" (video)

UK Part 1
 "Summertime" (album version)
 "Summertime" (RedOne remix)

UK Part 2
 "Summertime" (album version)
 "Summertime" (RedOne remix)
 "Summertime" (video)

Charts

Weekly charts

Year-end charts

Release history

References

2008 singles
New Kids on the Block songs
Interscope Records singles
Song recordings produced by RedOne
2008 songs
Songs written by Nasri (musician)
Songs written by Donnie Wahlberg